Cardamyla didymalis is a species of snout moth in the genus Cardamyla. It was described by Francis Walker in 1859 and is known from Australia.

The snout moth is about 40 mm. Adults are generally black and white.

References

Moths described in 1859
Pyralini